James Curtis Joyner (born April 18, 1948) is a former United States district judge of the United States District Court for the Eastern District of Pennsylvania.

Education and career

Born in Newberry, South Carolina, Joyner received a Bachelor of Science degree from Central State University in Ohio in 1971 and a Juris Doctor from Howard University School of Law in 1974. He also attended the National Judicial College at University of Nevada at Reno. He was a legal publications specialist, United States Office of the Federal Register, Washington, D.C. from 1974 to 1975. He was in private practice in West Chester Pennsylvania from 1975 to 1987. He was an assistant district attorney of Chester County, Pennsylvania from 1975 to 1980. He was a chief deputy district attorney of Chester County from 1980 to 1984, and first assistant district attorney of that jurisdiction from 1984 to 1987. He was a judge on the Court of Common Pleas, 15th Judicial District, Chester County, Pennsylvania from 1987 to 1992.

Federal judicial service

On November 5, 1991, Joyner was nominated by President George H. W. Bush to a new seat on the United States District Court for the Eastern District of Pennsylvania created by 104 Stat. 5089. He was confirmed by the United States Senate on April 8, 1992, and received his commission on April 13, 1992. He served as Chief Judge from 2011 to 2013. He took senior status on May 1, 2013. Joyner retired from active service on September 15, 2021.

See also 
 List of African-American federal judges
 List of African-American jurists

References

Sources
 

1948 births
Living people
20th-century American judges
21st-century American judges
African-American judges
Central State University alumni
Howard University School of Law alumni
Judges of the United States District Court for the Eastern District of Pennsylvania
People from Newberry, South Carolina
United States district court judges appointed by George H. W. Bush